Paola Loew (1934–1999) was an Austrian stage and film actress.

Early life and career
Born in the Italian city of Trieste she was educated in London and Buenos Aires. She made her screen debut in Argentine cinema, before emigrating to Germany where she starred in several films during the 1950s. However, much of her career was dedicated to the theatre.

Personal life
Loew was married to the pianist Friedrich Gulda from 1956 to 1966; they had two sons, David Wolfgang and Paul.

Filmography 
 The Soul of the Children (1951)
 The Orchid (1951)
 Columbus Discovers Kraehwinkel (1954)
 The Missing Miniature (1954)
 A Life for Do (1954)
 1972 The Great Waltz -_as Princess Pauline Metternich
 Der stille Ozean (1983)
 Das zweite Schraube-Fragment (1985)

References

Bibliography
Goble, Alan. The Complete Index to Literary Sources in Film. Walter de Gruyter, 1999.

External links

1934 births
1999 deaths
Austrian film actresses
Actors from Trieste
Austrian stage actresses
Austrian television actresses
20th-century Austrian actresses